Long Night is an album by jazz musician Frank Strozier, recorded in 1961 for Jazzland.

Reception
In a review for the August 16, 1962 issue of Down Beat magazine jazz critic Pete Welding wrote: "Strozier's writing for the sextet numbers is spare and attractive: he has avoided the temptation to keep three horns going all the time and uses the tenor and baritone for effective ensemble accents."

Track listing 
"Long Night" (Strozier)4:34
"How Little We Know" (Leigh, Philip Springer)5:57
"The Need for Love" (Strozier)4:40
"The Man That Got Away" (Arlen, Gershwin)4:19
"Happiness Is a Thing Called Joe" (Arlen, Harburg)5:57
"The Crystal Ball" (Strozier)5:33
"Pacemaker" (Strozier)4:05
"Just Think It Over" (Strozier)4:02

Personnel 
 Frank Strozieralto sax, flute (6)
 George Colemantenor sax (1, 3, 6, 8)
 Pat Patrickbaritone sax (1, 3, 8), flute (6)
 Chris Andersonpiano
 Bill Leebass
 Walter Perkinsdrums

References 

1961 albums
Albums produced by Orrin Keepnews
Riverside Records albums
Frank Strozier albums